Ananorites is a genus of extinct cephalopods belonging to the ceratitd family Noritidae found in the Middle Triassic of the Himalaya. The shell is  thinly discoidal, evolute, and smooth; cross section highly compressed; venter narrowly rounded except at the late stage where sharp shoulders are developed.

As with others of its kind, Ananorites was probably a nektonic (swimming) stalking marine predator that spent its time hunting above the sea floor.

References 

 Arkell, et al., 1957.  Mesozoic Ammonoidea; Part L, Treatise on Invertebrate Paleontology. 
 Paleobiology Database entry on Ananorites

Noritidae
Ceratitida genera
Triassic animals of Asia
Middle Triassic ammonites